Castrica phalaenoides is a moth of the family Erebidae first described by Dru Drury in 1773. It is found in Mexico, Guatemala, Panama, Honduras, Costa Rica, Brazil, French Guiana, Peru, Venezuela, Ecuador and Trinidad.

References

Moths described in 1773
Phaegopterina
Moths of South America
Taxa named by Dru Drury